John Hannibal George  (30 May 1901 – 22 May 1996) was a New Zealand politician of the National Party.

George was born in 1901 at Roxburgh. After his education at Otago Boys' High School, he became a fruit grower.

He won the Central Otago electorate in 1954 after William Bodkin retired. The electorate was renamed to Otago Central in 1957, and George held it to 1969, when he retired.

He was Chairman of Committees from 1967 to 1969. He was appointed an Officer of the Order of the British Empire for services to politics in the 1970 New Year Honours. He died in 1996.

Notes

References
 

|-

|-

1901 births
1996 deaths
People educated at Otago Boys' High School
New Zealand National Party MPs
Members of the New Zealand House of Representatives
New Zealand MPs for South Island electorates
New Zealand Officers of the Order of the British Empire
20th-century New Zealand politicians